The Saturn Award for Best Make-up is one of the annual awards given by the Academy of Science Fiction, Fantasy and Horror Films. The Saturn Awards, which are the oldest film-specialized awards to reward science fiction, fantasy, and horror achievements (the Hugo Award for Best Dramatic Presentation is the oldest award for science fiction and fantasy films), included the category for the first time at the 2nd Saturn Awards for the 1973 film year, eight years before the introduction of the Academy Award for Best Makeup; the winner was An American Werewolf in London (1981).

Rick Baker currently holds the record for most wins with seven and for the most nominations with seventeen.

Winners and nominees

1970s

1980s

1990s

2000s

2010s

2020s

References

External links
 
 IMDb: 2nd, 3rd, 4th, 5th, 6th, 7th, 8th, 9th, 10th, 11th, 12th, 13th, 14th, 15th, 16th, 17th, 18th, 19th, 20th, 21st, 22nd, 23rd, 24th, 25th, 26th, 27th, 28th, 29th, 30th, 31st, 32nd, 33rd, 34th, 35th, 36th, 37th, 38th, 39th, 40th, 41st, 42nd, 43rd, 44th, 45th, 46th, 47th

Make-up
Film awards for makeup and hairstyling